Duncan Kennedy (born 1942) was the Carter Professor of General Jurisprudence at Harvard Law School until 2015. Now emeritus, he is best known as one of the founders of the critical legal studies movement in legal thought.

Education and early career

Kennedy received an A.B. from Harvard College in 1964 and then worked for two years in the CIA operation that controlled the National Student Association.  In 1966 he rejected his "cold war liberalism."  He quit the CIA and in 1970 earned an LL.B. from Yale Law School. After completing a clerkship with Supreme Court Justice Potter Stewart, Kennedy joined the Harvard Law School faculty, becoming a full professor in 1976. In March 2010 he received an Honoris Causa (honorary degree) Ph.D. title from the University of the Andes in Colombia. In June 2011, he also received an Honnoris Causa Ph.D title from the Université du Québec à Montréal in Canada.

Kennedy has been a member of the American Civil Liberties Union since 1967. According to his own testimony, he has never forgotten to pay his dues.

Academic work and influence
In 1977, together with Karl Klare, Mark Kelman, Roberto Unger, and other scholars, Kennedy established the critical legal studies movement. Outside legal academia, he is mostly known for his monograph Legal Education and the Reproduction of Hierarchy*, famous for its trenchant critique of American legal education.

Bibliography
 "Form and Substance in Private Law Adjudication," 89 Harvard Law Review 1685 (1976)
 "Freedom and Constraint in Adjudication: A Critical Phenomenology," 36 Journal of Legal Education 518 (1986)
 Sexy Dressing, etc. (Harvard University Press, 1993)
 A Critique of Adjudication [fin de siècle] (Harvard University Press, 1997)
 "A Semiotics of Critique," 22 Cardozo Law Review 1147 (2001)
 "Thoughts on Coherence, Social Values and National Tradition in Private Law," in Hesselink, ed., The Politics of a European Civil Code (Kluwer Law International, Amsterdam, 2006)

See also
 Critical legal studies
 Indeterminacy debate in legal theory
 List of deconstructionists
 List of law clerks of the Supreme Court of the United States (Seat 8)
 Philosophy of law

Notes

External links
Duncan Kennedy's Personal Website
Duncan Kennedy's Harvard Law School Home Page
Duncan Kennedy debates Noah Feldman in March 2008 at Harvard Law School, as part of a series on "Confronting Empire"
, lecture on law and economics

1942 births
Living people
Critical legal studies
Harvard Law School faculty
People from Washington, D.C.
Philosophers of law
Harvard College alumni
Yale Law School alumni
Law clerks of the Supreme Court of the United States